Reginald John "Reg" Schroeter, sometimes referred to as Reginald Schroter, (September 11, 1921 – July 30, 2002) was a Canadian ice hockey player. He was a member of the Ottawa RCAF Flyers who won the gold medal in ice hockey for Canada at the 1948 Winter Olympics in St. Moritz.

In 2001 Reg Schroeter was honoured by the Canadian Forces when it was announced that the 1948 RCAF Flyers were selected as Canada's greatest military athletes of the 20th century.

References

External links
Reginald Schroeter's profile at databaseOlympics
Reginald Schroeter's profile at Sports Reference.com

1921 births
2002 deaths
Ice hockey players at the 1948 Winter Olympics
Olympic gold medalists for Canada
Olympic ice hockey players of Canada
Olympic medalists in ice hockey
Medalists at the 1948 Winter Olympics
Canadian ice hockey left wingers